Caras e Bocas is an album by Brazilian singer Gal Costa released in 1977.

Track listing 
"Caras e Bocas" (Caetano Veloso, Maria Bethania) 4:04
"Me Recuso" (Ritta Lee, Luis Sergio, Lee Marcucci) 4:09
"Louca Me Chamam" ("Crazy He Calls Me") (Carl Sigman, Bob Russell; Portuguese Translations by Augusto de Campos) 3:26
"Clariô" (Pericles Cavalcanti) 4:57
"Minha Estrela É Do Oriente" (Tindoró Dindinha) (Jorge Ben) 2:55
"Tigresa" (Veloso) 4:12
"Negro Amor" ("It's All Over Now, Baby Blue")  (Bob Dylan; Portuguese Translations by Caetano Veloso and Pericles Cavalcanti) 6:16
"Meu Doce Amor" (Marina, Duda Machado) 2:36
"(In My) Solitude" (Duke Ellington, Irving Mills, Eddie DeLange; Portuguese Translations by Augusto de Campos) 3:12
"Um Favor" (Lupicinio Rodrigues) 5:58

References 

1977 albums
Gal Costa albums